Bhawana Jha is an Indian politician and was the former member of Bihar Legislative Assembly from Benipatti (Vidhan Sabha constituency). In the 2015 Bihar Assembly Election, she contested from Benipatti (Vidhan Sabha constituency), Madhubani district and defeated senior BJP leader Vinod Narayan Jha.

References 

Living people
Bihar MLAs 2015–2020
Women members of the Bihar Legislative Assembly
1973 births
Indian National Congress politicians from Bihar
21st-century Indian women politicians